A chart with the best selling manga in Japan is published weekly by Oricon. This list includes the manga that reached the number one place on that chart in 2008.

Chart history

References

2008 manga
2008 in comics
2008